Calliostoma dedonderi is a species of sea snail, a marine gastropod mollusk in the family Calliostomatidae.

Some authors place this taxon in the subgenus Calliostoma (Ampullotrochus)

Description
The size of the shell varies between 6 mm and 14 mm.

Distribution
This marine species occurs off the Philippines.

References

 Vilvens C. (2000). Description of a new species of Calliostoma (Gastropoda: Trochidae) from the Philippine Islands. Novapex 1(3–4): 87–93

External links
 

dedonderi
Gastropods described in 2000
Marine molluscs